Hückelhoven is a town in the district of Heinsberg, in North Rhine-Westphalia, Germany. It is situated on the river Rur, approx. 10 km east of Heinsberg, 20 km south-west of Mönchengladbach and approximately 15 km from the border with the Netherlands.

Town parts
 Altmyhl
 Baal
 Brachelen
 Doveren
 Hilfarth
 Hückelhoven
 Kleingladbach
 Millich
 Ratheim
 Rurich
 Schaufenberg

Twin towns – sister cities

Hückelhoven is twinned with:
 Breteuil, France
 Hartlepool, England, United Kingdom

People 
 Adolf Freiherr Spies von Büllesheim (1929-2011), German politician, farmer and lawyer

References

Heinsberg (district)